Norman Snider (November 14, 1945 – January 4, 2019) was a Canadian screenwriter.

Credits
Partners (1976)
Dead Ringers (1988)
Body Parts (1991)
Rated X (2000)
Call Me: The Rise and Fall of Heidi Fleiss (2004)
Casino Jack (2010)

Snider collaborated with Dead Ringers director David Cronenberg on an early version of American Psycho.

References

External links

1945 births
2019 deaths
Canadian male screenwriters
Jewish Canadian writers
20th-century Canadian screenwriters
20th-century Canadian male writers
21st-century Canadian screenwriters
21st-century Canadian male writers